The Home Course is a public golf course owned and operated by the Washington State Golf Association and Pacific Northwest Golf Association, located in DuPont, Washington, just south of Tacoma. The Home Course is often referred to as "The Home of Golf in the Northwest" and has hosted a number of championships over the years including the 2014 U.S. Women's Amateur Public Links Championship, along with being the companion course to Chambers Bay for the 2010 U.S. Amateur.

Course Design 
The Home Course was designed by golf course architect Mike Asmundson, and opened for play in the summer of 2007. It is located on the site of a former dynamite manufacturing plant that was operated by the DuPont company, and after which the city of DuPont was named. The Home Course has five different sets of tees ranging from 7,424 yards at the longest to 5,470 yards at the shortest. The Home Course also has a set of tees for beginners, called the Little Home Course.

Course Scorecard

Dynamite Tees

Black Tees

Blue Tees

White Tees

Gold Tees

Little Home Course 

All hole names retrieved from: http://thehomecourse.com/golf/hole-by-hole/

References

External links 
 Official Website
 The Washington State Golf Association
 The Pacific Northwest Golf Association

Golf clubs and courses in Washington (state)
Buildings and structures in Pierce County, Washington
2007 establishments in Washington (state)